Horné Orešany is a village and municipality of the Trnava District in the Trnava region of Slovakia. It is located 16 km from the district capital Trnava and 48 km from Bratislava. A reservoir, also named Horné Orešany, is located nearby. The village is famous for its wine cultivation. A special type of wine Orešanské červené /The Red one from Orešany/ is a local and national wine speciality.

Famous people 
 František Zaťko (1896 – 1984), SDB,  Roman Catholic priest end Missionary (United States).

See also
 List of municipalities and towns in Slovakia

References

Genealogical resources

The records for genealogical research are available at the state archive "Statny Archiv in Bratislava, Slovakia"

 Roman Catholic church records (births/marriages/deaths): 1684-1896 (parish A)
 Lutheran church records (births/marriages/deaths): 1666-1895 (parish B)

External links
 http://www.horneoresany.sk
 http://www.horesany.host.sk/
Surnames of living people in Horne Oresany

Villages and municipalities in Trnava District
Hungarian German communities